Cola reticulata is a species of flowering plant in the family Malvaceae. It is found in Ivory Coast, Ghana, and Guinea. It is threatened by habitat loss.

References

reticulata
Flora of West Tropical Africa
Flora of Ivory Coast
Flora of Ghana
Flora of Guinea
Vulnerable flora of Africa
Taxonomy articles created by Polbot
Taxa named by Auguste Chevalier